Gavin Mogopa (born 2 April 1996) is a Botswana judoka.  He competed at the 2016 Summer Olympics in Rio de Janeiro, in the men's 60 kg, where he was defeated by Pavel Petřikov in the second round.

In 2014, he competed in the boys' 55 kg event at the 2014 Summer Youth Olympics held in Nanjing, China. He lost his bronze medal match against Jorre Verstraeten of Belgium.

References

External links

1996 births
Living people
Botswana male judoka
Olympic judoka of Botswana
Judoka at the 2016 Summer Olympics
Judoka at the 2014 Summer Youth Olympics